Goodmania is a genus of plants in the family Polygonaceae containing the single species Goodmania luteola. Its common name is yellow spinecape. It is a tiny annual herb forming small patches on the ground no more than a few centimeters high and wide. It has fuzzy club-shaped leaves and bears bright yellow flowers. The plant is native to California and Nevada.

References 

 Reveal, James L. & Ertter, Barbara J. (1976) "Goodmania (Polygonaceae), a New Genus from California" Brittonia 28 (4): 427–429.

External links 
 Jepson Manual Treatment
 USDA Plants Profile
 Photo gallery

Monotypic Polygonaceae genera
Flora of California
Flora of Nevada